Kurdistan TV is the first satellite television station in Iraqi Kurdistan that started broadcasting in 1999. It belongs to the Kurdistan Democratic Party (KDP) and is based in Erbil, Kurdistan Region.

The channel broadcasts programs mainly in Kurdish and can be viewed using a WS International satellite system. It transmits on the Eutelsat for Europe, Western Asia and North Africa, and on Galaxy 19 for North America.

Apart from its Kurdish language services, Kurdistan TV also offers an online news presence in Arabic and Turkish. Kurdistan TV's European offices are based in the Netherlands and Germany.

See also 
 List of Kurdish-language television channels

References

External links
 
 Kurdistan TV Live

Television stations in Kurdistan Region (Iraq)
Television stations in Iraq
Kurdish-language television stations
Television channels and stations established in 1999
1999 establishments in Iraq